The 2012–13 Mumbai F.C. season will be the club's sixth season since their formation in 2007 and their fifth season ever in the I-League which is India's top football league.

Background

The club played their first season in the I-League during the 2008–09 I-League season. The club played their first ever I-League match against historic club Mohun Bagan on 27 September 2008 in which Abel Hammond scored the first ever I-League goal for Mumbai FC as Mumbai went on to win 2–1 at the Barasat Stadium. Mumbai then completed a double against the two giant Kolkata clubs after they defeated East Bengal F.C. at the Salt Lake Stadium 1–0 with Felix Aboagye scoring the only goal. Mumbai then played their first ever home match in their history at the Cooperage Ground on 11 October 2008 with Kalia Kulothungan scoring the only goal in the match. Half-way through the season Mumbai was placed in sixth place in the table. The club, however, could not last in the I-League and finished in 7th place which currently remains their best position to date.

Transfers

In:

Out:

Note: Flags indicate national team as has been defined under FIFA eligibility rules. Players may hold more than one non-FIFA nationality.

Federation Cup

Mumbai entered the 2012 Indian Federation Cup automatically as they were already in the I-League. They were placed in Group A along with defending I-League champions Dempo, Pailan Arrows, and Shillong Lajong and their matches were played in Jamshedpur. The tournament did not end well for Mumbai as they lost two of their matches and drew one, finishing with 1 point, 3 goals scored and 7 conceded.

I-League

Mumbai began their first I-League game of 2012–13 away from home on 6 October 2012 against Pailan Arrows in which the team lost 3–2. The next match was not any better as Mumbai lost 3–2 to Pune at the Balewadi Sports Complex in Pune on 11 October 2012. After the defeat Mumbai had a two-week break before their next match on 27 October 2012 against Churchill Brothers at the Fatorda Stadium in Margao, Goa but when the match came Mumbai failed to secure yet another point as they lost their third game on the trot by a score of 3–1 with Ghanaian Yusif Yakubu scoring his first goal for Mumbai.

Mumbai started November with yet another lost as they stumbled to former champions Salgaocar at the Balewadi Sports Complex 1–0 after a 9th-minute goal for Francis Fernandes. This was Mumbai's fourth loss in a row and thus meant that after the first four matches of season, Mumbai had managed to win 0 points. However Mumbai finally won their first match of the season in their fifth attempt as they came back from 2–0 down to win 3–2 on 9 November 2012 at the Balewadi Sports Complex with Gabriel Fernandes, Justin Stephen, and Afghani international Zohib Islam Amiri scoring the goals for Mumbai. Mumbai then won their second game in a row on 17 November 2012 against Sporting Clube de Goa at the Balewadi Sports Complex Nicholas Rodrigues, Gabriel Fernandes, Justin Stephen, and David Opara providing the goals for Mumbai. Mumbai then drew their first match of the season in a surprising 1–1 draw on 25 November 2012 with Mohun Bagan at the Balewadi Sports Complex after former Indian international Abhishek Yadav scored the equalizer for Mumbai in the 62nd minute after three-time I-League top scorer Odafe Onyeka Okolie gave Bagan the lead in the 21st minute. The club then ended the month of November with their third win in four games on 28 November 2012 against ONGC F.C. at the Balewadi Sports Complex (this was Mumbai's 5th home game in a row) after Ghanaian Evans Quao gave Mumbai the winner in the 73rd minute.

The club then began the month of December with a major upset over new rich-boys Prayag United S.C. at the Salt Lake Stadium in Kolkata after Evans Quao scored a 52nd-minute equalizer for Mumbai after Ranti Martins gave Prayag the lead in the 29th minute; Mumbai then scored two more goals with Abhishek Yadav and Yusif Yakubu being the scorers in the 82nd and 94th minute to award Mumbai a special 3–2 victory. The club then went from major upsetters to the team that was getting the upset against them after the club lost 4–1 to relegation fighters Air India FC at the Balewadi Sports Complex. This was Mumbai's first loss in 6 games. The club then regrouped and went back onto the winning track after they defeated newly promoted side United Sikkim at the Balewadi Sports Complex on 15 December 2012 with David Opara being the only goalscorer for Mumbai in the 45th minute as the club won 1–0. The club then came up as the surprise winners again after they defeated Kolkata giants East Bengal F.C. at the Balewadi Sports Complex 2–1 thanks to goals from Gabriel Fernandes and Yusif Yakubu in the 64th and 94th minutes respectively; this result pushed Mumbai into fifth place, ahead of Prayag United, eight rounds after they found themselves in last place in the I-League and staring relegation in the face. Mumbai then ended the month of December and 2012 with a draw against the reigning champions of the I-League, Dempo S.C. at the Balewadi Sports Complex on 30 December 2012.

Then to begin the month of January and the year 2013 Mumbai took on United Sikkim at the Paljor Stadium on 9 January 2013 in Round 15 after their Round 14 clash with Mohun Bagan was canceled due to Bagan being expelled from the league. Mumbai drew the match late on by a score of 2–2 after Yusif Yakubu scored the equalizer for the club four minutes into second half stoppage time but not before he gave Mumbai the lead in the 11th minute before United Sikkim scored two goals in the 15th and 18th minutes of the match. The club then succumbed to their first loss of the season on 13 January 2013 when the club lost to East Bengal at the Kalyani Stadium in West Bengal by a score of 2–0 with Edeh and Lalrindika Ralte scoring the goals for East Bengal. However Mumbai did not let that loss get to them as they went back to winning ways on 19 January 2013 against Prayag United at the Balewadi Sports Complex when the club beaten them by a score of 2–1 with Gabriel Fernandes scoring the goal for Mumbai in the 30th minute before C.K. Vineeth equalized for Prayag in the 47th minute but Mumbai then won the match three minutes later in the 50th minute when Bello Razaq scored an own-goal and thus award the victory to Mumbai. The club then played their final match of January 2013 on 24 January 2013 against Churchill Brothers in which the club drew the match 0–0.

Results summary

Position by round

Players

First-team squad

Goalscorers

References

Mumbai FC seasons
Mumbai